Eckles Run is a tributary of the Beaver River in western Pennsylvania.  The stream rises in south-central Lawrence County and flows east entering the Beaver River at Wampum, Pennsylvania. The watershed is roughly 35% agricultural, 54% forested and the rest is other uses. This is the only stream of this name in the United States.

References

Rivers of Pennsylvania
Tributaries of the Beaver River
Rivers of Lawrence County, Pennsylvania